Cédric Heymans (born 20 July 1978) is a French former rugby union footballer who played mainly as a wing or a full-back for French Top 14 club Toulouse and the France national team. 

Known for his pace and his footwork, he started his club career with Brive where he won the Heineken Cup in 1997 before moving to Agen, where he stayed four seasons. He then moved to Toulouse in 2001 and won the Heineken Cup three times and the Top 14 twice. After ten years spent with the most successful club in France, he played two seasons for Bayonne before retiring in 2013.

Heymans scored 16 tries for the France national team within 59 caps. He won the Six Nations Championship three times, including one Grand Slam in 2004.

Biography
Cédric Heymans was born on 20 July 1978 in Brive-la-Gaillarde, Corrèze. He started rugby in Meyssac, his hometown near Brive-la-Gaillarde, and then moved to French elite club Brive later.

Heymans made his debut for France in a match against  in Paris as a reserve during the 2000 Six Nations Championship. He made one other appearance for France that year, starting in a match against  in Bucharest.

Heymans earned 8 caps for France during 2005, playing in the 2005 Six Nations Championship matches against  and Italy as well as subsequent matches against the Springboks, Australia and Canada. In 2006, he played in three tests for France during the 2006 Six Nations Championship, as well as the 2006 mid-year rugby tests against Romania and the Springboks.

Heymans was the only person to have won the Heineken Cup on four occasions, having won it with Brive in 1997 and then with Toulouse three times in 2003, 2005 and 2010. However after the 2017–18 Champions Cup this record was equalled by Isa Nacewa, Johnny Sexton and Devin Toner as four time winners. He is also the youngest player to be involved in a final.

In 2010, he was selected in the French Barbarians squad to play Tonga on 26 November. After missing out on selection for the 2011 Six Nations Championship, Heymans was named in the French squad for the 2011 Rugby World Cup.

Personal life
Heymans and his wife Justine have three children. 

He currently works as a commentator and pundit for Canal+, and as a chief commercial officer for French fruit manufacturing company and Brive sponsor Andros as well.

Honours

Brive
 Heineken Cup: 1996–97

Toulouse
 Heineken Cup: 2002–03, 2004–05, 2009–10
 Top 14: 2007–08, 2010–11

France
 Six Nations Championship: 2004 (Grand Slam), 2006, 2007

References

External links
 

1978 births
Living people
People from Brive-la-Gaillarde
French rugby union players
CA Brive players
SU Agen Lot-et-Garonne players
Stade Toulousain players
Aviron Bayonnais players
Rugby union wings
Rugby union fullbacks
France international rugby union players
Sportspeople from Corrèze